Sarsala is a village in Bundi district, in the state of Rajasthan in northwest India. It is situated near Bhimber road. It is an old village. Lohars and Rajas are famous families in this village.

Villages in Bundi district